Tennis at the 2019 Pacific Games in Apia, Samoa was held on 8–13 July 2019 at the Apia Park Tennis Courts.

Medal summary

Medal table

Medalists

See also
 Tennis at the Pacific Games

References

2019 Pacific Games
Pacific Games